The Nobel Peace Prize is one of the five Nobel Prizes established by the will of Alfred Nobel, Swedish inventor and industrialist, along with the prizes in Chemistry, Physics, Physiology or Medicine, and Literature. Since March 1901, it has been awarded annually (with some exceptions) to those who have "done the most or the best work for fraternity between nations, for the abolition or reduction of standing armies and for the holding and promotion of peace congresses".

The Norwegian Nobel Committee, a five-member body nominated by the Norwegian Parliament, chooses the laureate in accordance with Alfred Nobel's intention. The Committee invites qualified individuals to submit nominations for the Prize each year. Nomination of oneself is not permitted. There have been years when the prize was not given out despite the annual invitations and selections because of the start of World War I (1914, 1915, 1916, and 1918), World War II (1939–1943), and some specific circumstances (1923, 1924, 1928, 1932, 1955, 1956, 1966, 1967, and 1972). Due to the killing of Mahatma Gandhi, the Peace Prize was also not awarded in 1948 since, in the Committee's words, "there was no acceptable live contender." During to the committee's deliberations there were years when none of the nominees in the year they are listed met the criteria in Nobel's will. Thus, the awarding of the Prize was also postponed twelve times: Elihu Root (1912), Woodrow Wilson (1919), Austen Chamberlain (1925), Charles G. Dawes (1925), Frank B. Kellogg (1929), Norman Angell (1933), Carl von Ossietzky (1935), International Committee of the Red Cross (1944), Albert Schweitzer (1952), Office of the United Nations High Commissioner for Refugees (1954), Albert Lutuli (1960), and Linus Pauling (1962).

Nominees by their first nomination

1901–1909

1910–1919

1920–1929

1930–1939

1940–1949

1950–1959

1960–1969

1970–1974 
Nominees are published 50 years later so 1974 nominees should be published at the beginning of 2025.

See also 
 List of peace activists
 List of Nobel Peace Prize laureates
 List of female nominees for the Nobel Prize
 List of organizations nominated for the Nobel Peace Prize

Motivations

References 

+
Peace